Jaromír Kudera (born 4 August 1990) is a Czech luger. He competed in the men's doubles event at the 2018 Winter Olympics.

References

External links
 

1990 births
Living people
Czech male lugers
Olympic lugers of the Czech Republic
Lugers at the 2018 Winter Olympics
Place of birth missing (living people)